The men's 58 kg  competition in taekwondo at the 2008 Summer Olympics in Beijing took place on August 22 at the Beijing Science and Technology University Gymnasium.

Competition format
The main bracket consisted of a single elimination tournament, culminating in the gold medal match. Two bronze medals were awarded at the taekwondo competitions. A repechage was used to determine the bronze medal winners. Every competitor who lost to one of the two finalists competed in the repechage, another single-elimination competition. Each semifinal loser faced the last remaining repechage competitor from the opposite half of the bracket in a bronze medal match.

Schedule
All times are China standard time (UTC+8)

Qualifying Athletes

Results
Legend
PTG — Won by points gap
SUP — Won by superiority
OT — Won on over time (Golden Point)

Main bracket

Repechage

References

Taekwondo at the 2008 Summer Olympics
Men's events at the 2008 Summer Olympics